Cinetorhynchus is a genus of shrimp in the family Rhynchocinetidae. It was originally described in 1995 by Lipke Holthuis as a subgenus of the genus Rhynchocinetes, but was elevated to the rank of genus by Okuno in 1997. Both genera share the characteristic jointed rostrum, but differ in the numbers and positions of various spines. Cinetorhynchus contains the following species:
Cinetorhynchus brucei Okuno, 2009
Cinetorhynchus concolor (Okuno, 1994)
Cinetorhynchus erythrostictus Okuno, 1997
Cinetorhynchus fasciatus Okuno & Tachikawa, 1997
Cinetorhynchus gabonensis Ďuriš, Šobáňová & Wirtz, 2019
Cinetorhynchus hawaiiensis Okuno & Hoover, 1998
Cinetorhynchus hendersoni (Kemp, 1925)
Cinetorhynchus hiatti (Holthuis & Hayashi, 1967)
Cinetorhynchus manningi Okuno, 1996
Cinetorhynchus reticulatus Okuno, 1997
Cinetorhynchus rigens (Gordon, 1936)
Cinetorhynchus striatus (Nomura & Hayashi, 1992)

References

Caridea